Malone Stadium is a stadium in Monroe, Louisiana, United States, on the campus of the University of Louisiana at Monroe.  It is primarily used for football and is the home field of the ULM Warhawks. The stadium, named for former coach James L. Malone, opened in 1978 and has a seating capacity of 27,617 people. The field Was named JPS Field, for a local company, JPS Aviation/JPS Equipment Rental. The field was named after the company after they agreed to fund installation of a new FieldTurf playing surface in 2014.

History
Because Northeast Louisiana University's previous stadium could hold just over 8,000 spectators, the late Mayor W. L. "Jack" Howard pushed for construction of a new football stadium. Malone Stadium, named after the winningest coach in school history James L. Malone, opened on September 16, 1978, with a capacity of 20,000, with the then-Northeast Louisiana Indians beat Arkansas State, 21–13.

It is located across Bayou Desiard from the main campus, the center of the school's athletic facilities.  The field runs roughly north-northeast, with an imbalanced grandstand, the west stands being the larger stands.  The lower west level is a solid enclosed structure, with the ULM Athletic Training Center enclosed, and the upper level extends much higher, with the press box and luxury boxes located on top.  The east side is also decked, with a short first deck wrapping around almost from goalpost to goalpost and another short steel-supported upper deck running the length of the field.

Renovations
Both sides of seating were extended into each end zone in 1983, increasing the capacity to 23,277. The press box was enlarged in 1991, and capacity decreased to 22,077. In 1993, 8,350 seats were added to the stadium, increasing capacity to its current figure of 30,427.

In 2007, ULM excavated the natural grass from Malone Stadium to install ProPlay artificial turf.

Also, a new sound system was installed in the upper corners of the scoreboard.

A record crowd of 31,175 was reached on September 21, 2012 against the Baylor Bears at the 2012 home opener.

In 2014, JPS Aviation/JPS Equipment Rental paid $450,000 to replace the artificial turf with new FieldTurf and for the field to be named JPS Field at Malone Stadium for the next eight seasons.

A new field house facility was completed in August 2016 at a cost of $4.1 million. The  building is located in the north end zone, attached to the west grandstand. It features a hall of fame area, locker room, coaches’ offices, and patios overlooking the field.

Largest crowds
The largest crowd to see a Warhawk football game in Malone Stadium was 31,175 on September 21, 2012, when the Warhawks hosted Baylor University. In 2020, there was only 25% of people allowed due to the COVID-19 pandemic.

See also
List of NCAA Division I FBS football stadiums

References

External links
 JPS Field at Malone Stadium - ULMAthletics.com

College football venues
Louisiana–Monroe Warhawks football
American football venues in Louisiana
Sports venues in Monroe, Louisiana
Sports venues in Louisiana
1978 establishments in Louisiana
Sports venues completed in 1978